Melody (born Khin Myo Ei on 6 September 1982) is a Burmese film actress and singer. She won the 2011 Myanmar Motion Picture Academy Awards for Best Actress for her work in the film, Htawara alintan mya. She married Tha Kaung in February 2014. She gave birth to her first child, a son named Siddhi Sit (သိဒ္ဓိစစ်), on 4 April 2015.

Filmography
Kyauk Sat Yay (2009)
Hot Shot 2
I Love You
A Chit Ka Lan Tal
A Chit Lar Lar Htar
Academy Shot (cameo)
A Lann Zayar (2011)
Htar Waya A Linn Tan Myar (2011)
A Lann Lun A Lun Lann (2012)
Chu Si (2018)

References

External links
Melody on Facebook

1982 births
Burmese film actresses
Living people
21st-century Burmese actresses
People from Yangon Region